Talke Pits is a former mining village in the Borough of Newcastle-under-Lyme, Staffordshire, England, close to the Cheshire border and the village of Talke.Population details taken at the 2011 census can be found under Kidsgrove.

The nature reserve Parrot's Drumble is adjacent to the village.

References 

Villages in Staffordshire
Borough of Newcastle-under-Lyme
Mining communities in England